Football is one of the leading sports of Puerto Rico, ranking only behind baseball, basketball and boxing in national popularity and is the number one participation sport on the island. There has been a significant growth in the sport in recent years, as traditionally football has played a very small role in Puerto Rico. The sport on the island is governed by the Puerto Rican Football Federation, an affiliate of FIFA.

History

Early years (1900-1919)
It is said that the sport was played during Spanish colonial times, mostly by soldiers in the field in front of El Morro. By 1904, games were being played there between sailors of foreign ships which docked in San Juan Harbor, but it was not until 1911 that the first organized club was formed, Comercio Sporting Club, which organized games between members of the club. The club then formed two teams, Minerva and Mercurio. These teams took part in the first organized tournament in Puerto Rico, Copa Porananmiz. In 1913, two more clubs where formed, San Juan FC and Ponce Sporting Club. Until then, football was mostly played by the Hispanic population of the island while the Americans would play sports like baseball and basketball, but in 1914 a group of Americans formed Celtics FC and the first rivalry of Puerto Rican football was born. Celtics were Americans and San Juan FC were Puerto Ricans and Spaniards, which brought up the tensions between the Hispanics and Americans in the island during this period. In 1914, Celtics traveled to Ponce to face Ponce Sporting Club, in the first ever reported game between teams from different towns in Puerto Rico.

National team

Since its foundation, the Puerto Rico national football team has been one of the least successful teams in the world. It did not even enter the qualification stage for the 2006 World Cup. Its highest FIFA ranking was 97 in March 1994, and its lowest was 202 in November 2004. Until 2008, Puerto Rico had not fielded a national team since 2004 when they lost 5–2  to Grenada. The last time they had won a match was in 1993 when they won 4–0 against the Cayman Islands.

After a four-year absence, the Puerto Rican national team re-emerged on 16 January 2008, with a 2–0 victory in a friendly match against Bermuda. This was played in preparation for a World Cup qualifier against the Dominican Republic, scheduled for 26 March 2008, which Puerto Rico won 1–0.

Club football

Club football had been a very limited affair involving a handful of amateur teams in several separate leagues. As the domestic game has grown in popularity, this started to change. The Puerto Rico Islanders began to play in the USL First Division, the second tier of football in the United States at the time, and, in 2008, the first ever unified competition, the Puerto Rico Soccer League, was established. Many clubs on the island are now affiliated with larger teams in some of the world's major football leagues.

In 2011, club football teams on the island made another monumental leap. The Puerto Rico Islanders joined the North American Soccer League, which is the new second tier of football in the United States. In addition, Puerto Rico United, Club Atlético River Plate Puerto Rico and Sevilla FC Puerto Rico moved to USL Pro, the new third tier of football in the United States. The Puerto Rico Soccer League held a 2011 season. However, the PRSL folded after the 2011 season, making the Liga Nacional de Fútbol de Puerto Rico the top-tier league, even though it is an amateur league. The LNFPR split into a First Division and Second Division in order to fill the void left by PRSL. Seeking to restructure professional football in Puerto Rico, the PRFF was planning for the Liga Profesional de Fútbol de Puerto Rico, which was supposed to start in 2013.

Puerto Rican association football leagues and associations
 Puerto Rican football league system
 Liga Nacional de Fútbol de Puerto Rico
 Campeonato Nacional de Fútbol de Puerto Rico (defunct)
 Liga Mayor de Fútbol Nacional (defunct)
 Puerto Rico Soccer League (defunct)
 Puerto Rican Football Federation

Puerto Rican teams
 Puerto Rico men's national football team
 Puerto Rico women's national football team

References

External links